Lim Ban Hong (born 22 March 1977) is a Malaysian politician who has served as Member of the Melaka State Legislative Assembly (MLA) for Kelebang from May 2013 to May 2018 and again since November 2021. He served as the Deputy Minister of International Trade and Industry in the Barisan Nasional (BN) administration under former Prime Minister Ismail Sabri Yaakob and former Minister Azmin Ali from August 2021 to the collapse of the BN administration in November 2022 and the first term in the Perikatan Nasional (PN) administration under former Prime Minister Muhyiddin Yassin and former Minister Azmin from March 2020 to the collapse of the PN administration in August 2021, Senator from March 2020 to his resignation in November 2022 as well as Member of the Melaka State Executive Council (EXCO) in BN state administration under former Chief Minister Idris Haron from July 2014 to the collapse of the BN state administration in May 2018. He is a member and State Chairman of Melaka of the Malaysian Chinese Association (MCA), a component party of the BN coalition. He has also served as the Vice President of MCA since November 2018.

Politics
Lim first won in 2013 state election to serve as Member of the Malacca State Legislative Assembly (MLA) for Kelebang from May 2013 to May 2018. He had also served as member of the Malacca State Executive Council (EXCO) for the Transport, Project Rehabilitation and International Trade Executive Committee of the state.

He, however, was defeated by Pakatan Harapan (PH) candidate Gue Teck and failed to defend his position as the MLA for Kelebang in the 2018 state election which also saw the collapse of the BN administration in the simultaneous 2013 general election (GE14). After the earlier GE14 outcome, in the November 2018 party leadership election, Lim was elected as the Vice-President of MCA in the new leadership line-up.

Following the collapse of PH in the February 2020 Malaysian political crisis also dubbed as 'Sheraton Move', which led to the appointment of the new Prime Minister Muhyiddin Yassin and formation of the new PN administration in March the same year, as MCA-BN is an allied partner, he was picked as the Deputy Minister of International Trade and Industry and Senator by Muhyiddin for him to be appointed as a deputy minister. He was sworn-in and appointed by Yang di-Pertuan Agong, Al-Sultan Abdullah.

In November 2021 state election, he get to be re-elected again after regaining the Kelebang seat back by defeating the incumbent Gue Teck.

Election results 
{| class="wikitable" style="margin:0.5em ; font-size:95%"
|+ Malacca State Legislative Assembly   
!|Year
!|Constituency
!colspan=2|
!|Votes
!|Pct
!colspan=2|Opponent(s)
!|Votes
!|Pct
!|Ballots cast
!|Majority
!|Turnout
|-
|2013
| rowspan="5" |N14 Kelebang, P136 Tangga Batu| |
|Lim Ban Hong (MCA)
|align="right" |9,171|56.45%| |
|Liou Chen Kuang (DAP)
|align="right" |7,074
|43.55%
|16,629 
|2,097
|87.16%
|-
|rowspan=2|2018
|rowspan=2  |
|rowspan=2|Lim Ban Hong (MCA)
|rowspan=2 align="right" |6,859
|rowspan=2|40.88%
| |
|Gue Teck (PKR)
|align="right" |7,648|45.58%|rowspan=2|17,059
|rowspan=2|789
|rowspan=2|84.59%
|-
| |
|Mohd Syafiq Ismail (PAS)
|align="right" |2,272
|13.54%
|-
| rowspan="2" |2021
| rowspan="2"  |
| rowspan="2" | Lim Ban Hong (MCA)| rowspan="2" align="right" |5,028| rowspan="2" |38.49%| |
|Gue Teck (PKR)
|align="right" | 4,152
| 31.78%
|rowspan=2| 13,064
|rowspan=2| 876
|rowspan=2| 66.31%
|-
| |
|Bakri Jamaluddin (PAS)
|align="right" |3,884
|29.73%
|}

Honours
Honours of Malaysia
  :
  Companion Class I of the Order of Malacca (DMSM) – Datuk''' (2014)

References

External links 
 Lim Ban Hong on Facebook
 Lim Ban Hong on Twitter

1977 births
Living people
Malaysian people of Chinese descent
Malaysian Chinese Association politicians
Members of the Dewan Negara
Members of the Malacca State Legislative Assembly
21st-century Malaysian politicians